Immunotherapy or biological therapy is the treatment of disease by activating or suppressing the immune system. Immunotherapies designed to elicit or amplify an immune response are classified as activation immunotherapies, while immunotherapies that reduce or suppress are classified as suppression immunotherapies. Immunotherapy is under preliminary research for its potential to treat various forms of cancer.

Cell-based immunotherapies are effective for some cancers. Immune effector cells such as lymphocytes, macrophages, dendritic cells, natural killer cells, and cytotoxic T lymphocytes work together to defend the body against cancer by targeting abnormal antigens expressed on the surface of tumor cells. Vaccine-induced immunity to COVID-19 relies mostly on an immunomodulatory T cell response.

Therapies such as granulocyte colony-stimulating factor (G-CSF), interferons, imiquimod and cellular membrane fractions from bacteria are licensed for medical use. Others including IL-2, IL-7, IL-12, various chemokines, synthetic cytosine phosphate-guanosine (CpG) oligodeoxynucleotides and glucans are involved in clinical and preclinical studies.

Immunomodulators
Immunomodulators are the active agents of immunotherapy. They are a diverse array of recombinant, synthetic, and natural preparations.

Activation immunotherapies

Cancer

Cancer treatment used to be focused on killing or removing cancer cells and tumours, with chemotherapy or surgery or radiation. These treatments can be very effective and in many cases are still used. In 2018 the Nobel Prize in Physiology or Medicine was awarded to James P. Allison and Tasuku Honjo "for their discovery of cancer therapy by inhibition of negative immune regulation." Cancer immunotherapy attempts to stimulate the immune system to destroy tumours. A variety of strategies are in use or are undergoing research and testing. Randomized controlled studies in different cancers resulting in significant increase in survival and disease free period have been reported  and its efficacy is enhanced by 20–30% when cell-based immunotherapy is combined with conventional treatment methods.

One of the oldest forms of cancer immunotherapy is the use of BCG vaccine, which was originally to vaccinate against tuberculosis and later was found to be useful in the treatment of bladder cancer. BCG immunotherapy induces both local and systemic immune responses. The mechanisms by which BCG immunotherapy mediates tumor immunity have been widely studied, but they are still not completely understood.

The use of monoclonal antibodies in cancer therapy was first introduced in 1997 with rituximab, an anti-CD20 antibody for treatment of B cell lymphoma. Since then several monoclonal antibodies have been approved for treatment of various haematological malignancies as well as for solid tumours.

The extraction of G-CSF lymphocytes from the blood and expanding in vitro against a tumour antigen before reinjecting the cells with appropriate stimulatory cytokines. The cells then destroy the tumour cells that express the antigen. Topical immunotherapy utilizes an immune enhancement cream (imiquimod) which produces interferon, causing the recipient's killer T cells to destroy warts, actinic keratoses, basal cell cancer, vaginal intraepithelial neoplasia, squamous cell cancer, cutaneous lymphoma, and superficial malignant melanoma. Injection immunotherapy ("intralesional" or "intratumoural") uses mumps, candida, the HPV vaccine or trichophytin antigen injections to treat warts (HPV induced tumours).

Adoptive cell transfer has been tested on lung and other cancers, with greatest success achieved in melanoma.

Dendritic cell-based pump-priming or vaccination

Dendritic cells (DC) can be stimulated to activate a cytotoxic response towards an antigen. Dendritic cells, a type of antigen-presenting cell, are harvested from the person needing the immunotherapy. These cells are then either pulsed with an antigen or tumour lysate or transfected with a viral vector, causing them to display the antigen. Upon transfusion into the person, these activated cells present the antigen to the effector lymphocytes (CD4+ helper T cells, cytotoxic CD8+ T cells and B cells). This initiates a cytotoxic response against tumour cells expressing the antigen (against which the adaptive response has now been primed). The first FDA-approved cell-based immunotherapy, the cancer vaccine Sipuleucel-T is one example of this approach. The Immune Response Corporation (IRC) developed this immunotherapy and licensed the technology to Dendreon, which obtained FDA clearance.

The current approaches for DC-based vaccination are mainly based on antigen loading on in vitro-generated DCs from monocytes or CD34+ cells, activating them with different TLR ligands, cytokine combinations, and injecting them back to the patients. The in vivo targeting approaches comprise administering specific cytokines (e.g., Flt3L, GM-CSF) and targeting the DCs with antibodies to C-type lectin receptors or agonistic antibodies (e.g., anti-CD40) that are conjugated with antigen of interest. Future approach may target DC subsets based on their specifically expressed C-type lectin receptors or chemokine receptors. Another potential approach is the generation of genetically engineered DCs from induced pluripotent stem cells and use of neoantigen-loaded DCs for inducing better clinical outcome.

T-cell adoptive transfer
Adoptive cell transfer in vitro cultivates autologous, extracted T cells for later transfusion.

Alternatively, Genetically engineered T cells are created by harvesting T cells and then infecting the T cells with a retrovirus that contains a copy of a T cell receptor (TCR) gene that is specialised to recognise tumour antigens. The virus integrates the receptor into the T cells' genome. The cells are expanded non-specifically and/or stimulated. The cells are then reinfused and produce an immune response against the tumour cells. The technique has been tested on refractory stage IV metastatic melanomas and advanced skin cancer. The first FDA-approved CAR-T drug, Kymriah, used this approach. To obtain the clinical and commercial supply of this CAR-T, Novartis purchased the manufacturing plant, the distribution system and hired the production team that produced Sipuleucel-T developed by Dendreon and the Immune Response Corporation.

Whether T cells are genetically engineered or not, before re-infusion, lympho-depletion of the recipient is required to eliminate regulatory T cells as well as unmodified, endogenous lymphocytes that compete with the transferred cells for homeostatic cytokines. Lymphodepletion may be achieved by myeloablative chemotherapy, to which total body irradiation may be added for greater effect. Transferred cells multiplied in vivo and persisted in peripheral blood in many people, sometimes representing levels of 75% of all CD8+ T cells at 6–12 months after infusion. , clinical trials for metastatic melanoma were ongoing at multiple sites. Clinical responses to adoptive transfer of T cells were observed in patients with metastatic melanoma resistant to multiple immunotherapies.

Checkpoint inhibitors 

Anti-PD-1/PD-L1 and anti-CTLA-4 antibodies are the two types of checkpoint inhibitors currently available to patients. The approval of anti-cytotoxic T-lymphocyte-associated protein 4 (CTLA-4) and anti-programmed cell death protein 1 (PD-1) antibodies for human use has already resulted in significant improvements in disease outcomes for various cancers.

Although these molecules were originally discovered as molecules playing a role in T cell activation or apoptosis, subsequent preclinical research showed their important role in the maintenance of peripheral immune tolerance.

Immune checkpoint inhibitors are approved to treat some patients with a variety of cancer types, including melanoma, breast cancer, bladder cancer, cervical cancer, colon cancer, head and neck cancer, or Hodgkin lymphoma.

These therapies have revolutionized cancer immunotherapy as they showed for the first time in many years of research in metastatic melanoma, which is considered one of the most immunogenic human cancers, an improvement in overall survival, with an increasing group of patients benefiting long-term from these treatments.

Immune enhancement therapy
Autologous immune enhancement therapy use a person's own peripheral blood-derived natural killer cells, cytotoxic T lymphocytes, epithelial cells and other relevant immune cells are expanded in vitro and then re-infused. The therapy has been tested against Hepatitis C, Chronic fatigue syndrome and HHV6 infection.

Suppression immunotherapies

Immune suppression dampens an abnormal immune response in autoimmune diseases or reduces a normal immune response to prevent rejection of transplanted organs or cells.

Immunosuppressive drugs
Immunosuppressive drugs help manage organ transplantation and autoimmune disease. Immune responses depend on lymphocyte proliferation. Cytostatic drugs are immunosuppressive. Glucocorticoids are somewhat more specific inhibitors of lymphocyte activation, whereas inhibitors of immunophilins more specifically target T lymphocyte activation. Immunosuppressive antibodies target steps in the immune response. Other drugs modulate immune responses and can be used to induce immune regulation. It has been observed in a preclinical trial that regulation of the immune system by small immunosuppressive molecules such as Vitamin D, Dexamethasone, and Curcumin administered under a low-dose regimen and subcutaneously, could be helpful in preventing or treating chronic inflammation.

Immune tolerance

The body naturally does not launch an immune system attack on its own tissues. Models generally identify CD4+ T-cells at the centre of the autoimmune response. Loss of T-cell tolerance then unleashes B-cells and other immune effector cells on to the target tissue. The ideal tolerogenic therapy would target the specific T-cell clones co-ordinating the autoimmune attack.

Immune tolerance therapies seek to reset the immune system so that the body stops mistakenly attacking its own organs or cells in autoimmune disease or accepts foreign tissue in organ transplantation. A  recent therapeutic approach is the infusion of regulatory immune cells into transplant recipients. The transfer of regulatory immune cells has the potential to inhibit the activity of effector.

Creating immune tolerance reduces or eliminates the need for lifelong immunosuppression and attendant side effects. It has been tested on transplantations, rheumatoid arthritis, type 1 diabetes and other autoimmune disorders.

Allergies

Immunotherapy can also be used to treat allergies. While allergy treatments (such as antihistamines or corticosteroids) treat allergic symptoms, immunotherapy can reduce sensitivity to allergens, lessening its severity.

Immunotherapy may produce long-term benefits. Immunotherapy is partly effective in some people and ineffective in others, but it offers people with allergies a chance to reduce or stop their symptoms.

The therapy is indicated for people who are extremely allergic or who cannot avoid specific allergens.

A promising approach to treat food allergies is the use of oral immunotherapy (OIT). OIT consists in a gradual exposure to increasing amounts of allergen can lead to the majority of subjects tolerating doses of food sufficient to prevent reaction on accidental exposure. Dosages increase over time, as the person becomes desensitized. This technique has been tested on infants to prevent peanut allergies.

Helminthic therapies

Whipworm ova (Trichuris suis) and Hookworm (Necator americanus) have been tested for immunological diseases and allergies. Helminthic therapy has been investigated as a treatment for relapsing remitting multiple sclerosis Crohn's, allergies and asthma. The mechanism of how the helminths modulate the immune response, is unknown. Hypothesized mechanisms include re-polarisation of the Th1 / Th2 response and modulation of dendritic cell function. The helminths down regulate the pro-inflammatory Th1 cytokines, Interleukin-12 (IL-12), Interferon-Gamma (IFN-γ) and Tumor Necrosis Factor-Alpha (TNF-ά), while promoting the production of regulatory Th2 cytokines such as IL-10, IL-4, IL-5 and IL-13.

Co-evolution with helminths has shaped some of the genes associated with Interleukin expression and immunological disorders, such Crohn's, ulcerative colitis and celiac disease. Helminth's relationship to humans as hosts should be classified as mutualistic or symbiotic.

See also 
 Biological response modifier
 Sepsivac
 Checkpoint inhibitor
 Interleukin-2 immunotherapy
 Immunostimulant
 Microtransplantation
 Photoimmunotherapy in vitro or in vivo

References

External links 

 
 International Society for Biological Therapy of Cancer
 Cancer Research Institute Annual International Cancer Immunotherapy Symposia Series
 The story behind immunotherapy's innovative cellular voyage

 
Cancer immunotherapy
Virotherapy